Estadio Los Cuchumatanes is a football stadium located in Huehuetenango, Guatemala. It is home to Liga Nacional club Xinabajul. Its capacity is around 5,340. The stadium opened its doors on January 17, 2007.

References

External links
 Photos and some information

Los Cuchumatanes
Huehuetenango Department
Sports venues completed in 2007
2007 establishments in Guatemala